Grant Cashmore (born 12 September 1968) is a New Zealand equestrian. He competed in show jumping at the 2004 Summer Olympics in Athens.

References

1968 births
Living people
New Zealand male equestrians
Olympic equestrians of New Zealand
Equestrians at the 2004 Summer Olympics
20th-century New Zealand people
21st-century New Zealand people